Turks Head Bay is a small bay between Tryggve Point and Turks Head on the west side of Ross Island. The bay name appears to be first used on a map of the British Antarctic Expedition (1910–13) and is in association with Turks Head.

Bays of Ross Island